Edwin Ray Denney (March 8, 1904 - June 22, 1986) was the Republican nominee for Governor of Kentucky in 1955.  He lost the general election to Democrat Happy Chandler, who won his second non-consecutive term as governor in that election.  Denney won 322,671 votes (41.7%) to Chandler's 451,647 (58.3%).  Chandler's victory margin of 129,000 votes was the largest landslide in the Kentucky gubernatorial elections up to that time. Denney died on June 22, 1986 at the age of 82.

References

External sources
The Kentucky Encyclopedia

Kentucky Republicans
1904 births
1986 deaths